Peck's Bad Girl was a 1959 American TV series, starring Wendell Corey and Patty McCormack which aired on CBS. The show revolved around the misadventures of a twelve-year-old girl growing up and how she related to her family. Patty McCormack, who had played a sinister little girl in The Bad Seed played the lead character, Torey Peck. The title drew inspiration from the Peck's Bad Boy stories.

The show was presented as a family comedy centered on Torey, who would talk directly to the audience about herself and the events from in front of a black screen at points during the episode. Peck's Bad Girl replaced the Arthur Godfrey Show. 

The New York Times said in its review of the show: "PECK'S BAD GIRL, which had its debut... is another situation-comedy series on family life and a further reminder of the sustained superiority of Father Knows Best." After its poor reception in 1959, CBS re-ran the entire series in the summer of 1960 to no better success.

Peck's Bad Girl was also the title of a 1918 silent film with an unrelated storyline.

Cast
Patty McCormack as Torey Peck, twelve-year-old girl
Wendell Corey as Steve Peck, her father
Marsha Hunt as Jennifer Peck, her mother
Ray Ferrell as Roger Peck, her younger brother
Reba Waters as Francesca, her girlfriend 

Guest stars included Jane Withers, Patrick O'Neal and Jacques Bergerac.

References

Peck's Bad Girl, Classic TV Archive

External link
 
 Review of entire season, New Castle News, August 5, 1959 

1959 American television series debuts
1959 American television series endings
CBS original programming
Black-and-white American television shows
1950s American sitcoms